San Luis de Palenque is a town and municipality in the Department of Casanare, Colombia. The town is on a bend of the Pauto River, a tributary of the Meta River.

It is served by San Luis de Palenque Airport.

External links
San Luis de Palenque (Spanish)

Municipalities of Casanare Department